is a 1967 Japanese war film directed by Kihachi Okamoto.  The subject of the majority of the movie is the period between noon on August 14, 1945 and noon on August 15, 1945, when Emperor Hirohito's decision to surrender to the Allies in World War II was broadcast to the Japanese people, and the attempted coup d'état to prevent that from happening.  Film historian Joseph L. Anderson describes the film as "a meticulous reconstruction of the day Japan surrendered and thus ended the Pacific War.

Cast

Production
According to Okamoto, Masaki Kobayashi was originally supposed to direct Japan's Longest Day but didn't want to, so co-producer Sanezumi Fujimoto suggested that Okamoto direct it.  Okamoto believes that this film and his subsequent film The Human Bullet (1968) are expressions of his anti-war feelings.  Japan's Longest Day portrays the actual people who were able to remain above the fighting, but did fight with each other, while The Human Bullet is a satire of those who did have to fight in the war.

Release
Japan's Longest Day was released in Japan on August 12, 1967, close to the anniversary of the surrender. This started a trend of releasing World War II films on the anniversary, which included Okamoto's 1971 film The Battle of Okinawa.  It became the second highest grossing film in Japan in 1967.  Shinobu Hashimoto won the Kinema Junpo Award for best screenplay. The film was re-released theatrically in Japan on November 21, 1982 as part of Toho's 50th anniversary. A remake of Japan's Longest Day, identically titled in Japanese but released in English under the title The Emperor in August, was issued in 2015 by Shochiku, directed by Masato Harada.

References

1967 films
Films directed by Kihachi Okamoto
Japanese epic films
Films with screenplays by Shinobu Hashimoto
1960s Japanese-language films
World War II films based on actual events
Pacific War films
Toho films
Films produced by Tomoyuki Tanaka
Films produced by Sanezumi Fujimoto
Films scored by Masaru Sato
Cultural depictions of Hirohito
1960s Japanese films